Tennis events were contested at the 1983 Summer Universiade in Edmonton, Alberta, Canada.

Medal summary

Medal table

See also
 Tennis at the Summer Universiade

External links
World University Games Tennis on HickokSports.com

1983
Universiade
1983 Summer Universiade